Abraham ben Ephraim Niederländer, also known as Abraham Sofer and the Sofer of Prague, was a sixteenth-century Jewish-Austrian mathematician.

The scribe of Rabbi Judah Loew ben Bezalel, Niederländer also published Brit Avraham (1609), a work on arithmetic based largely on Elijah Mizrachi's Sefer ha-Mispar as well as non-Jewish works on mathematics.

References

 

16th-century Austrian mathematicians
Austrian Jews
Czech Jews
Jewish scribes (soferim)
Mathematicians from Prague